Gerrhopilus floweri, also known as Flower's worm snake or Flower's blind snake, is a species of snake in the family Gerrhopilidae. The species is endemic to Southeast Asia.

Etymology
The specific name, floweri, is in honor of British zoologist Stanley Smyth Flower.

Geographic range
It is found in Thailand.

References

Further reading
Boulenger GA (1899). In: Flower SS (1899). "Notes on a Second Collection of Reptiles made in the Malay Peninsula and Siam, from November 1896 to September 1898, with a List of the Species recorded from those Countries". Proc. Zool. Soc. London 1899: 600–696. (Typhlops floweri, new species, p. 654 + Plate XXXVII, figure 2).

floweri
Reptiles described in 1899